"Midnight at the Oasis" is a song written by David Nichtern. It was recorded in 1973 by American folk and blues singer Maria Muldaur for her self-titled album (1973) and is her best-known recording; it peaked at #6 on the US Billboard Hot 100 and #21 in the UK Singles Chart in the spring of 1974. Billboard ranked it as the No. 13 song for 1974. It was also nominated for both Record of the Year and Song of the Year at the 17th Annual Grammy Awards, held in 1975. In Canada, the song reached #2 in the RPM magazine singles charts and #45 in the year-end chart.

Description
The song is a saucy offer of a desert love affair, in a fantasy setting.
AllMusic reviewer Matthew Greenwald describes the song as "so sensual and evocative that it was probably one of the most replayed records of the era and may be responsible for the most pregnancies from a record during the mid-'70s".

The song includes an instrumental section that features the guitar work of Amos Garrett.

The lyric, "Cactus is our friend", is used several times in the song, but cacti are New World plants (native to North America, South America, and the West Indies) and are not naturally found on the Arabian Peninsula.

In 2008, Muldaur recalled that she wanted to add the song to her album as an "afterthought" at the last minute. She has acknowledged that people do approach her at her concerts or events and claim that this song has inspired sexual encounters, loss of virginity, and pregnancy.

Personnel
Source:

 Maria Muldaur – vocals
 David Nichtern – acoustic guitar
 Mark T. Jordan – piano 
 Greg Prestopino – voices 
 Freebo – bass 
 Amos Garrett – electric guitar 
 Jim Gordon – drums 
 Nick DeCaro – string arrangements

Chart performance

Weekly charts

Year-end charts

Brand New Heavies version

A version of "Midnight at the Oasis" was recorded by British acid jazz and funk group Brand New Heavies, attributed to "Brand New Heavies featuring N'Dea Davenport". This version reached number 13 in the UK and number 11 in Scotland in August 1994, and was their biggest hit up until the departure of Davenport, when "Sometimes" made number 11 in 1997. The song was featured on their 1994 album Brother Sister.

Critical reception
Caroline Sullivan from The Guardian stated that N'Dea Davenport, "whose glistening voice glorifies even a lazy cover version of "Midnight at the Oasis"." In his weekly UK chart commentary, James Masterton described it as a "faithfully rendered cover". A reviewer from Music & Media said, "Usually lite funky music is identified with garden parties and romantic restaurants at night by trendy clubbers, but not if marketed under the Acid Jazz banner. This is hip guys!" Alan Jones from Music Week gave it four out of five and named it Pick of the Week, writing, "Stripped of the stretched jazzy gliding that typified Maria Muldaur's original, this 1974 hit is speeded up somewhat but adapts perfectly to the Acid Jazz treatment. More radical overhauls are also included for clubs, where the record is already going down a storm."

Music video
A music video was made to accompany the song. It was directed by directors Max Giwa and Dania Pasquini, known as just Max & Dania.

Track listing
 CD single, UK
"Midnight at the Oasis" (Radio Version) – (3:48)
"Midnight at the Oasis" (Rogers Brand New Radio Anthem) – (4:35)

 CD single, UK (BNHCD 05)
"Midnight at the Oasis" (Radio Version) – (3:48)
"Midnight at the Oasis" (Extended Version)
"Midnight at the Oasis" (Opaz 7" Version)
"Midnight at the Oasis" (Roger's Brand New Radio Anthem) – (4:35)

Charts

Personnel
Simon Bartholomew
N'Dea Davenport – Vocals
Jan Kincaid
Richard Stilgoe
Andrew Levy

Other covers

 Jazz versions of this song have been recorded by Hubert Laws on The Chicago Theme (1975), by Freddie Hubbard on the live album Gleam (1975) and the studio album Liquid Love (1975), and by Wayne Henderson on "Living On A Dream" (1978).
 Percy Faith recorded an easy listening version on Chinatown Feat. the Entertainer (1974), which features the guitar work of Larry Carlton.
 A cover version of the song appears on the album Dust Yourself Off (1975) by the funk band Pleasure.
 Saxophone instrumental version by Rudy Pompilli, player for Bill Haley & His Comets), was included on his 1976 album Rudy's Rock: The Sax That Changed the World.
 Betty Wright Live (1978), by Betty Wright, includes a medley version of "Clean Up Woman" that includes parts of "Midnight at the Oasis".
 The Sun City Girls released a version of the song on their album Midnight Cowboys from Ipanema (1986).
 The American jazz guitarist Steve Oliver released a version of the song on his album First View (1993).
 That Dog released a version of the song on the  album Spirit of '73: Rock for Choice (1995).
 Jazz guitarist Martin Taylor included an instrumental version on his album Kiss and Tell (2000) with support from saxophonist Kirk Whalum.
 Actress and Broadway singer Valarie Pettiford of UPN's Half & Half covered the song on her album Hear My Soul (2004).
 Renee Olstead sings the song on her 2004 self-titled album.
 Marina Prior recorded the song for her album Both Sides Now (2012).
 Nicole Henry covered the song in her album “Time to Love Again” (2021).

Remix version
In 2004, Muldaur's original version was featured on the CD What Is Hip: Remix Project 1, a compilation of pop songs remixed for the clubs. The single is billed as the "Cuica Remix", with the track extended from its 3:49 recording to 4:49, incorporating portions of the background vocal, strings, and instrumental break with semi-chilled out Ibiza-themed elements.

In popular culture
An instrumental version was used in the movie White Line Fever (1975), as was another David Nichtern song, "Drifting and Dreaming of You".
It was performed in American Pie at the prom.
The song is sung by the lounge act at the hotel in Sofia Coppola's film Lost in Translation.
In the film The First $20 Million Is Always the Hardest (2002), Andy (played by Adam Garcia) plays this song while sitting on the floor of his room, and Alisa (Rosario Dawson) comes in singing and dancing.
In Whisper (2007), when Roxanne (Sarah Wayne Callies) lulls the kidnapped boy, David Sandborn (Blake Woodruff) to sleep.
The song was frequently used as bumper music on Coast to Coast AM with Art Bell.
The song was performed by Sheila and Ron Albertson (Catherine O'Hara and Fred Willard) in their audition for the community theatre musical "Red, White, and Blaine" in the Christopher Guest mockumentary "Waiting for Guffman".

References

External links
  - live version at MariaMuldaurVEVO
[ All Music Guide]

1973 songs
1974 singles
American soft rock songs
Delicious Vinyl singles
FFRR Records singles
Reprise Records singles
Song recordings produced by Lenny Waronker
Music videos directed by Max & Dania
The Brand New Heavies songs